All Nite Madness is the second album from Mousse T. It was released in 2004.

Track listing
"Underground" (with Hugh Cornwell) - (studio)
"Is It 'Cos I'm Cool?" (with Emma Lanford) - (studio)
"Sex Has Gone" (with Andrew Roachford) - (studio)
"By Myself" (with Inaya Day) - (studio)
"Music Makes Me Fly" (with Amiel) - (studio) 
"Wow" (with Emma Lanford) - (studio) 
"Turn Me On" (with Kathleen Chaplin) - (studio)
"Right About Now" (with Emma Lanford) - (studio)
"Monotony" (with Calvin Lynch) - (studio)
"All Nite Madness" (with Hanifah Walidah) - (studio) 
"Pop Muzak" (with Andrew Roachford) - (studio)
"Bounce" (with Dacia Bridges) - (studio)
"Theme Of Cool" - (studio)
"Just Look At Us Now" (with James Kakande) - (studio)
"Is It 'Cos I'm Cool?" (Torso Club Mix) (bonus track) - (studio) 
"Pop Muzak" (Ian Pooley Remix) (bonus track) - (studio)

Mousse T. albums
2004 albums